Eugenio Pizzuto Puga (born 13 May 2002) is a Mexican professional footballer who plays as a midfielder for Liga 3 club Braga B.

Club career

Early career
Born in San Luis Potosí, Pizzuto was first spotted at the age of 12 in 2013 by scout Jess Ibrom of the New Zealand-based Asia-Pacific Football Academy which worked in association with Chelsea FC (now merged with professional side Wellington Phoenix) during open trials in the city of Monclova, Mexico. Following his performances, Pizzuto was offered a place in the academy along with a scholarship to Scots College in Wellington.

Pachuca
Following his time at Wellington Phoenix - where he was unable to play senior football due to FIFA laws preventing the international transfer of minors - Pizzuto returned to Mexico and joined the youth ranks of Pachuca in 2018.

On 21 January 2020, Pizzuto made his professional debut during a Copa MX group stage match against Ascenso MX club Venados. Four days later, Pizzuto made his Liga MX debut, coming on as a 59th-minute substitute for Franco Jara in an eventual 3–0 loss against León. However, just nine minutes after coming on, Pizzuto broke his fibula and dislocated his ankle after getting his foot caught on the pitch.

Lille
On 1 August 2020, Pizzuto joined French side Lille on a free transfer. He debuted for the club's reserve team, Lille II, on 10 October, coming on as a substitute on the 58th minute against US Maubeuge, winning 3–1. He appeared on the bench for the first team for first time as an unused substitute on 22 November in a league match against Lorient, winning 4–0.

On 17 January 2022, Pizzuto's contract was terminated by Lille making him a free agent.

Braga
On 26 January 2022, Pizzuto joined Braga.

International career

Youth
Pizzuto was part of the under-17 squad that participated at the 2019 CONCACAF U-17 Championship, where Mexico won the competition. He was included in the Best XI of the tournament. He was the captain of the team that participated at the 2019 U-17 World Cup. Finishing runner-up against Brazil, he won the Bronze Ball of the tournament. He was included in the France Football team of the tournament.

Pizzuto was called up by Raúl Chabrand to participate with the under-21 team at the 2022 Maurice Revello Tournament, where Mexico finished the tournament in third place.

Personal life
Pizzuto is of Italian descent. His father is from Italy and his mother from Mexico.

Career statistics

Club

Honours
Lille
Ligue 1: 2020–21

Mexico U17
CONCACAF U-17 Championship: 2019
FIFA U-17 World Cup runner-up: 2019

Individual
CONCACAF U-17 Championship Best XI: 2019
FIFA U-17 World Cup Bronze Ball: 2019
France Football FIFA U-17 World Cup Best XI: 2019

References

External links
 
 
 

2002 births
Living people
People from San Luis Potosí City
Mexican people of Italian descent
Footballers from San Luis Potosí
Association football midfielders
Mexico youth international footballers
Liga MX players
Ligue 1 players
Tercera División de México players
Championnat National 3 players
C.F. Pachuca players
Lille OSC players
Wellington Phoenix FC players
S.C. Braga players
Mexican expatriate footballers
Mexican expatriate sportspeople in New Zealand
Expatriate association footballers in New Zealand
Mexican expatriate sportspeople in France
Expatriate footballers in France
Mexican expatriate sportspeople in Portugal
Expatriate footballers in Portugal
Mexican footballers